Pseudoclavibacter endophyticus is a Gram-positive, aerobic, rod-shaped and non-motile bacterium from the genus Pseudoclavibacter which has been isolated from the roots of the plant Glycyrrhiza uralensis from Yili County in China.

References

Microbacteriaceae
Bacteria described in 2016